John Pauly is the Reid Weaver Dennis Professor of Engineering in the Department of Electrical Engineering at Stanford University.

He is co-director of the Magnetic Resonance Systems Research Laboratory (MRSRL), which designs improved MRI techniques and equipment. 
 He is Advisor to Stanford Student Space Initiative.

Education 
Pauly completed a B.S. in Electrical Engineering from Iowa State University in 1979. In 1981, an M.S. in EE from Carnegie-Mellon University, and in 1990, completed his PhD from Stanford Department of Electrical Engineering.

Pauly joined Stanford as a research associate in 1990. He joined the electrical engineering faculty in 2001.

Research 
Pauly's research areas include magnetic resonance imaging, medical imaging, signal processing, and image reconstruction. He is Advisor to Stanford Student Space Initiative.

Particularly in image reconstruction, fast imaging methods, pulse sequence and RF pulse design. Pauly led the Real-time MRI effort in the 1990s.

As of July 2019, Pauly has been granted approximately 66 patents. He is also a registered US Patent agent.

Pauly is also involved with Stanford Amateur Radio Club, W6YX. He is a registered FCC Extra Class Amateur Radio License (AG6WH). He offers a course for students interested in obtaining a license.

Awards and honors
 2012 Gold Medal, International Society of Magnetic Resonance in Medicine 
 2014 Fellow, American Institute of Medical and Biological Engineering (AIMBE) 
 2005 Fellow, International Society of Magnetic in Medicine

References

External links 
 Stanford profile John Pauly
 Prof. John Pauly Research Site
 Complete list of published work PubMed.gov, John Pauly

Stanford University Department of Electrical Engineering faculty
Living people
American electrical engineers
Stanford University School of Engineering faculty
Carnegie Mellon University alumni
Stanford University alumni
Electrical engineering academics
Stanford University faculty
Year of birth missing (living people)